Flugopterus is an extinct genus of prehistoric bony fish that lived during the Carnian stage of the Late Triassic epoch.

References

External links
 

Late Triassic fish
Triassic fish of Europe